James Tompkins was an Australian rules footballer for . In a match against West Adelaide at Alberton Oval in 1903 he kicked 15 goals (3 behinds). This feat would remain the club record until 1980 when Tim Evans kicked 16 goals, also in a match against West Adelaide.

References

Port Adelaide Football Club (SANFL) players
Port Adelaide Football Club players (all competitions)
Australian rules footballers from South Australia